Ximen is a Chinese compound surname. Ximen literally means "west gate", the origination story says that there was a noble family in Zheng or Qi state live near the west gate, so the descents took Ximen (west gate) as their family name.  As compound surnames are rare in China, some Ximen families have changed their name to the single surname Xi(西).

Notable people named Ximen 
 Ximen Bao, minister and court advisor in Wei
 Ximen Qing, fictional character in Water Margin and The Plum in the Golden Vase
 Ximen Chuixue, fictional character in The Legend of Lu Xiaofeng
 Ximen Yan, fictional character in Meteor Garden (2018 TV series)
 Ximen Nao (西门闹), fictional main character in Life and Death Are Wearing Me Out by Mo Yan

Notes

Chinese-language surnames
Individual Chinese surnames